Shanshan Feng (born 5 August 1989) is a Chinese former professional golfer who previously played on the U.S.-based LPGA Tour. She was the first player from China to become a member of the LPGA Tour, which she joined in 2008. Feng had 10 victories on the tour, including the 2012 LPGA Championship, a major title, in which she shot a bogey-free 67 in the final round to win by two strokes. She was the first player from China to win an LPGA major championship, as well as the first player from mainland China (male or female) to have won a major championship. Her best finish in 16 previous majors was a tie for 22nd at the 2012 Kraft Nabisco Championship. With the victory, she moved from tenth to fifth in the Women's World Golf Rankings. On 20 August 2016, Feng won the Olympic bronze medal in women's golf at the 2016 Olympic Games in Rio de Janeiro. From November 2017 to April 2018, she was first in the Women's World Golf Rankings.

In August 2022, Feng announced her retirement from professional golf.

Early life, family and early golf development

Feng was born in Guangzhou, in the province of Guangdong, and started playing golf at age 10 at the urging of her father, Feng Xiong, who worked at the golf association in their hometown.

Due to limited resources and a lack of reputable golf coaches, Feng's father, who was the captain of a junior golf team, worked with her every day. During the week, Feng would attend school from 8 a.m. to 5 p.m., and then her father would bring her to the driving range where she would practice for two hours hitting golf balls off a mat. On the weekends, she travelled outside of the city to a local course to play practice rounds and work on her short game.

When Feng was in high school an agent discovered her, at a tournament in China, and this led to her meeting coach Gary Gilchrist. When Feng was 17 years old, Gilchrist offered her a full scholarship to attend his junior golf academy in Hilton Head, South Carolina. Feng accepted the offer and moved to the U.S hoping to become a professional golfer. Despite the scholarship to Gilchrist's academy, living expenses, tuition at a nearby high school, and traveling costs became heavy financial burdens on her parents, Feng Xiong and  Zheng Yuyan, who both work at governmental institutes and earn average salaries. Feng's parents had spent almost all of their savings by the end of 2007, and they considered mortgaging their house to support their daughter. However, the family support paid off in December 2007 when Feng, a teenager amateur, earned a spot on the LPGA Tour's 2008 season after tying for ninth place at the Tour's qualifying tournament.

Amateur career
Feng won the China Junior Championship and the China Junior Open in 2004. She was a three-time winner of the China Amateur Tournament (2004–06). She was the Champion of the 2006 China Women's Amateur Open. A member of the 2006 All-China Championship Team, she earned a medalist honors at the event. In 2007 she was named Golfweeks's Top Chinese Amateur after winning four tournaments on the International Junior Golf Tour (IIGT) in 2007.

While still an amateur, Feng tied for ninth at the LPGA Final Qualifying Tournament in December 2007 to earn a spot on the LPGA Tour in 2008.

Professional wins (23)

LPGA Tour wins (10)

^ Co-sanctioned with the LPGA of Japan Tour

LPGA Tour playoff record (0–3)

LPGA of Japan Tour wins (7)

^ Co-sanctioned with the LPGA Tour

Ladies European Tour wins (7)

Ladies European Tour  playoff record (1–0)

Other wins (1)
2012 World Ladies Championship (team event with Liying Ye)

Major championships

Wins (1)

Results timeline
Results not in chronological order before 2019.

^ The Evian Championship was added as a major in 2013

CUT = missed the half-way cut
"T" = tied

Summary

Most consecutive cuts made – 12 (2013 Kraft Nabisco – 2015 WPC)
Longest streak of top-10s – 4 (2014 British – 2015 ANA)

Olympics medals (1)

Singles: 1 (1 bronze medal)

LPGA Tour career summary

 official through 2021 season

World ranking
Position in Women's World Golf Rankings at the end of each calendar year.

Team appearances
Amateur
Espirito Santo Trophy (representing China): 2004

Professional
International Crown (representing China): 2016

See also
List of golfers with most LPGA major championship wins
List of golfers with most LPGA Tour wins

References

External links

Chinese female golfers
LPGA Tour golfers
Ladies European Tour golfers
Winners of LPGA major golf championships
Olympic golfers of China
Olympic medalists in golf
Golfers at the 2016 Summer Olympics
Golfers at the 2020 Summer Olympics
2016 Olympic bronze medalists for China
Golfers at the 2006 Asian Games
Asian Games competitors for China
Sportspeople from Guangzhou
1989 births
Living people